The 2008 AFL draft consisted of four opportunities for player acquisitions during the 2008/09 Australian Football League off-season. These were trade week (held between 6 October and 10 October), the national draft (held on 29 November), the pre-season draft (16 December) and the rookie draft (16 December).

Player changes

Trades
Throughout the year there was much speculation about high-profile players such as Jonathan Brown, Alan Didak and Daniel Kerr being likely to be traded during the AFL's annual trading period, but each re-signed with their clubs before the trading period started. The main discussions during trade week were the surprise request by Ryan O'Keefe to be traded from Sydney, as well as the destination of young Fremantle ruckman Robert Warnock, both of whom wished to be traded back to their home city of Melbourne. Other players to request trades include Andrew Lovett, Brent Prismall, Mark Seaby, Farren Ray, Josh Carr and Daniel Harris.

North Melbourne surprised many early in the week by naming Hamish McIntosh and Corey Jones as players available to trade, with McIntosh later being withdrawn from the offer after a backlash from his manager and club legend Glenn Archer.

Like most years, no trades were completed during the first three days of the trade week and for the first time the AFL was requested to assist by providing a mediator to solve the stand-off between Fremantle and Carlton over the Warnock deal.  Carlton had offered its second round selection, #24 overall, but Fremantle wanted its first round selection, the sixth overall. On the final day of trade week Warnock was traded. The deal included Fremantle's pick No. 69, in exchange for Carlton's picks 24, 56 and 72.

In total only six trades were completed, with O'Keefe, Lovett, Seaby, Carr and Harris unable to finalise deals during the week.

Retirements and delistings

2008 national draft 
The 2008 national draft was held on 29 November.  Melbourne finished the 2008 AFL season in last position and had the first selection in the draft.  As both Melbourne and West Coast Eagles won less than 5 games during the season, they were eligible for a priority pick.  As this was the first year in which they qualified, the priority pick was allocated between the first and second rounds of selections.

Ayce Cordy was the first player selected in the draft as the only father–son selection. The Western Bulldogs had to use their 1st round selection, #14, to secure him after St Kilda bid their #1st round selection for him.  His father, Brian, played 124 games for the Bulldogs in the 1980s.

The top two selections were widely tipped to be Jack Watts and Nic Naitanui, with Daniel Rich, Ty Vickery, Stephen Hill, Chris Yarran and Hamish Hartlett  to fill the next few selections.

2009 pre-season draft
The pre-season draft was held on 16 December 2008 (but is referred to as the 2009 pre-season draft in continuation from the early years of the AFL draft when it was held in January or February) and most pre-draft interest was on whether or not former West Coast Eagles captain and Brownlow Medal winner Ben Cousins would be selected by the Richmond Football Club. Richmond, the only club to show interest in recruiting Cousins, had one selection in the pre-season draft (because it had only one space left on its senior list). In the week leading up to the pre-season draft, Richmond requested to have Graham Polak (who had been hit by a tram the previous season, with it not clear at this stage whether or not the resulting injuries would end his career) moved to the rookie list, to free up an additional list space and give them a second selection in the pre-season draft. The request was similar to one made by and granted to the Essendon Football Club a few years earlier with respect to Adam Ramanauskas, but there were key differences which led to Richmond's request being rejected by the AFL and a majority of rival clubs on December 15.  Although Richmond had maintained throughout the previous week that it would draft Cousins only if its request to put Polak on the rookie list was granted, they selected Cousins anyway with their only selection in the pre-season draft.  Josh Carr's return to Port Adelaide was the other major player move.

2009 rookie draft 
Due to the expansion in the number of rookie places available for clubs to use - from the previous maximum of six players to the maximum of eight rookies and veteran listed players combined - the 2009 rookie draft featured more selections than usual.

Rookie elevation 
A total of 15 players were promoted from their respective clubs' rookie lists to the club's primary lists at the conclusion of the 2008 season.

Selections by league
National and pre-season draft selection totals by leagues:

References

Australian Football League draft
Draft
AFL draft
AFL draft